Grossuana thracica is a species of very small freshwater snail, an aquatic gastropod mollusc in the family Hydrobiidae

Distribution
This species is endemic to Bulgaria, where it is found at one site only. This site is the area where water emerges from the spring in Chirpan Bunar Cave, and flows into a small pond. The total area occupied by this species of snail is approximately 2 m of the spring's flow length. The cave is situated 3 km east of the village of Bolyarino, in the Upper Thracian Lowland.

References

 Glöer P. & Georgiev D. (2009) New Rissooidea from Bulgaria (Gastropoda: Rissooidea). Mollusca 27(2): 123-136. page(s): 133

Gastropods described in 2009
Hydrobiidae
Endemic fauna of Bulgaria